Metisella syrinx, the bamboo sylph, is a butterfly of the family Hesperiidae. It is a rare and highly localised species which is only known from South Africa in the eastern Cape, through southern Lesotho to the extreme south of KwaZulu-Natal. The habitat consists of rocky areas on the summits of mountains, in montane grassland.

The wingspan is 32–34 mm for males and 32–37 mm for females. Adults are on wing from January to February. There is one generation per year.

The larvae feed on Thamnocalamus tessellatus.

References

Heteropterinae
Butterflies described in 1868
Butterflies of Africa
Taxa named by Roland Trimen